Hipólito López (born 7 February 1952) is a Honduran long-distance runner. He competed in the marathon at the 1976 Summer Olympics. He finished eighth in the 10000 metres at the 1975 Pan American Games.

References

1952 births
Living people
Athletes (track and field) at the 1976 Summer Olympics
Honduran male long-distance runners
Honduran male marathon runners
Olympic athletes of Honduras
Athletes (track and field) at the 1975 Pan American Games
Athletes (track and field) at the 1979 Pan American Games
Pan American Games competitors for Honduras
Place of birth missing (living people)
Central American Games gold medalists for Honduras
Central American Games medalists in athletics